Shell Shock is an original novella written by Simon A. Forward and based on the long-running British science fiction television series Doctor Who. It features the Sixth Doctor and Peri. It was released both as a standard edition hardback and a deluxe edition featuring a frontispiece by Bob Covington. Both editions have a foreword by Guy N. Smith.

Synopsis

The Sixth Doctor and Peri find themselves stranded on an alien world that is mostly covered by water. The Doctor manages to make it to shore, where he has to work out a way to save Peri, the TARDIS and himself. Peri, however, is swallowed by an alien life-form intent on making her its god.

Plot

The TARDIS lands on a derelict vessel floating on the sea of an alien world almost completely covered by water. As Peri goes scuba diving, the derelict explodes. The TARDIS sinks to the bottom of the ocean, apparently taking the Doctor with it, and although Peri tries to find dry ground, she eventually sinks beneath the waters and drowns. She is rescued, in a way, by an alien creature that forms a mental link with her even as it begins to eat away her body. She relives some of her most terrible memories, including her sexual abuse at the hands of her stepfather, in a desperate attempt to retain her identity and individuality. Forward published a "first draft" of Peri's experiences in the Memory in the fanzine Mythmakers #14: Personal Reflections instead of recalling Peri's sexual abuse at the hands of her stepfather, she recalled her wild youth, pregnancy and resultant abortion. Forward stated that the change in the final manuscript was made at the request of editor David J. Howe, who thought it would be better to link the story to a fan theory about Peri's relationship with her stepfather, though not based on her character as seen in the television serials.

The Doctor, meanwhile, has been rescued by a giant crab called Scrounger, who was designed to fight in a war but is now surviving with others of his kind on a nearby island. Shortly after being taken there, the Doctor meets the only other humanoid around, Ranger, who is suffering from shell shock as a result of the war. He also shares a mental link through something called "The Memory", which used to issue orders during the war but has now fallen silent. As the Doctor struggles to communicate and come up with a plan to save himself, Ranger is attacked by an enemy crab, bigger than the others. He survives, and nicknames his attacker "Meathook".

Over time, the crabs begin to turn up dead, their shells broken and their insides eaten. The Doctor tries to organise the remaining crabs into a defence, and Scrounger is sent to find medical supplies in the sunken derelict. Instead, he finds an army of crabs, led by Meathook.

Peri, meanwhile, is finding that she can perceive things through the alien's senses, and discovers the Doctor's survival. She creates a female body, which she imbues with a spark of her intelligence, and sends it to find the Doctor. The female causes an aggressive response from Ranger, who drives her away, but soon they have other things to worry about: Meathook's army has arrived.

In trying to round up a defence, the Doctor heads to Ranger's cave, and finds the remains of the murdered crabs: it was Ranger who had been killing them. The Doctor manages to arrange for the beach dwellers and the woman to escape Meathook by sailing away on a raft that he and the crabs had been constructing, and the woman guides them towards the Memory. The Doctor is taken inside the Memory, where he finds a disembodied brain connected to it and Peri's scuba gear. His companion has been completely digested.

The Doctor links to the Memory and discovers that it was created by the corporations who created the crabs to fight in their war, and since the corporations abandoned the planet it has been being eaten by the local marine life. It reached out for Peri, desperate for a personality to hold itself together. The link to the Memory also allows the Doctor a connection to Ranger, from whom he learns that the crabs were prisoners of war, who had their brains transplanted into crab bodies to help fight the war. When Ranger's sister was similarly altered, Ranger feared for his own life and escaped to the beach.

Meathook breaks into the Memory and kills the female, but Ranger sacrifices himself to destroy Meathook – who he knows is his damaged sister. The two remaining groups of crabs join forces, and the Doctor advises them to let the Memory heal and help them build a new society. He uses his link to the Memory to piece together Peri's memories and transplant them into a newly grown body. The crabs collect the TARDIS, and the two are able to continue on their journey together.

External links
The Cloister Library - Shell Shock

Reviews
Shell Shock reviews at Infinity Plus

2003 British novels
2003 science fiction novels
Doctor Who novellas
British science fiction novels
Novels by Simon A. Forward
Telos Publishing books